Bobs Island is an island of the Falkland Islands. It is located in the western part of Salvador Water, north of East Falkland. It is located near the mouth of the Pedro River and Punta Acantilado on the Olivieri peninsula.

References

Islands of the Falkland Islands